Nigel Williams, sometimes known as NJ Williams is a British broadcaster and voice over artist.

Biography

Williams studied Electronic and Electrical Engineering at the University of Surrey where he became involved in the campus radio station as well as a broadcaster at Hospital Radio Wexham (Slough). In 1983, he began his professional radio career at County Sound in Guildford.

Later, he presented programmes for Radio City, Chiltern Radio, The Superstation, Virgin Radio, Magic 105.4, Heart 106.2, BBC Surrey and Smooth Radio.

At Heart 106.2 Williams presented Late Night Love Songs. The show featured true relationship stories sent in by listeners (Love Letters). Late Night Love Songs became the first show on the station to overtake Capital Radio as the market leader in London. A book of the best stories on Late Night Love Songs was published called 'Love Letters Straight from the Heart.'

In recent years, Williams has been a mainstay of Jazz FM's daytime schedule – and is currently the station's breakfast presenter.

As a voice-over artist, Williams has been heard on commercials for McDonald's, PC World, Shreddies, Cheerios, Lloyds TSB etc. He was the image voice for LWT and ITV from 1990 to 2004. He has been heard on LBC 97.3, LBC News 1152 and the Heart Network of radio stations. He voice has been used as the image voice of LBC, BBC Northampton, Compass FM, Ridings FM and Rutland Radio he continues to work as a voice-over talent from his own studios in London. Recent work includes Cadbury, training programmes for The United Nations and a controversial ad for the infidelity website Ashley Madison featured on the Howard Stern radio show. 

In January 2020, Williams was nominated for Best Music Presenter ARIAS https://www.radioacademy.org/arias/nominees-2020/

References

External links
Nigel Williams Official website.
6th Vision Ltd Showbiz Agent
Nigel Williams on Voiceovers.co.uk.
Nigel's YouTube Channel.

Living people
English radio DJs
Alumni of the University of Surrey
Year of birth missing (living people)